Viktor Savelievich Zheliandinov (17 March 1935 – 24 July 2021) was a Soviet-Ukrainian chess player, International Master and coach. He was awarded the Master title in 1962. He was a Soviet Army Champion in 1966. Zheliandinov won Belarus championships in 1970.

There are many international grandmasters and masters among Zheliandinov's apprentices. Among his students were such famous chess players as grandmasters Vassily Ivanchuk, Marta Litinskaya-Shul, Mateusz Bartel and Vitali Golod. Viktor Zheliandinov assisted the rise of former world champion Anatoly Karpov. Zheliandinov died on 24 July 2021 at the age of 86.

References

External links
 
 
 "Master Zheliandinov"

1935 births
2021 deaths
Soviet chess players
Ukrainian chess players
Russian chess players
Belarusian chess players
Chess International Masters
Chess coaches
People from Lyubertsy